The 1960 Kentucky Wildcats football team were an American football team that represented the University of Kentucky as a member of the Southeastern Conference during the 1960 NCAA University Division football season. In their seventh season under head coach Blanton Collier, the team compiled a 5–4–1 record (2–4–1 in the SEC).

Schedule

References

Kentucky
Kentucky Wildcats football seasons
Kentucky Wildcats football